Karitiana, otherwise known as Caritiana or Yjxa, is a Tupian language spoken in the State of Rondônia, Brazil, by 210 out of 320 Karitiana people, or 400 according to Cláudio Karitiana, in the Karitiana reserve 95 kilometres south of Porto Velho. The language belongs to the Arikém language family from the Tupi stock. It is the only surviving language in the family after the other two members, Kabixiâna and Arikém, became extinct.

History

Although the first Western contacts with the Karitiana people are believed to have begun in the 17th century, the first recorded contact dates to 1907 when a survey conducted by Cândio Rondon indicated that they were already working for Bolivian rubber tappers. Systematic contact between the Karitiana people and Caucasians, nevertheless began in the 1950s with the intervention of ISA and Roman Catholic Salesian missionaries. As a result of the missionaries' visit, a list of words and phrases were compiled, allowing Professor Aryon Rodrigues, who was working at the University of Campinas at the time, to classify the language as a member of the Arikém Family by comparing the language to existing materials on the Arikém language.

Many of the Karitiana people are bilingual in Karitiana and Portuguese, and despite the population growth in recent years and the language's high level of transmission, the language is listed as vulnerable by UNESCO due to the low number of speakers and the proximity to the city of Porto Velho. A literacy project in the 1990s resulted in 24 students being made literate, and written documentation of the culture, as well as audio recordings were created. As of 2005, indigenous teachers have been holding lessons in the villages. However, the literacy project ended in 1997 due to a lack of permanent funding.

Literature on Karitiana

Some of the earliest works on the language date to the 1970s by missionary David Landin, who spent time in the Karitiana village between 1972 and 1977, through a partnership between FUNAI (Fundação Nacional do Índio) and SIL International (Summer Institute of Linguistics) (Landin, 2005). He has mainly studied syntax (1984), but has also compiled lexicon that has resulted in the creation of a Karitiana dictionary (2005). Another early researcher is Gloria Kindell, also from the SIL, who has analyzed phonological and syntactic aspects of Karitiana (1981).

The first substantial grammar of Karitiana, however, was published by Luciana Storto (1999), describing topics on the phonology, morphology and syntax, and since then she has published a number of papers on Karitana syntax (2003, 2008, 2012, 2013, 2014). Subsequently, a number of studies on the language has continued to be published, covering a wide array of topics. Ana Müller, for example has published papers on Karitiana semantics (2006, 2009, 2010, 2012). Ivan Rocha da Silva has produced a variety of works on Karitiana syntax (Rocha 2014), including two extensive descriptions on syntactical topics (2011, 2016). Ethnographically, Felipe Ferreira Vander Velden has documented a number of social aspects of the Karitiana people, specifically researching about the relations between indigenous peoples and animals. He has published a book about domestic animals among the Kartitiana (2012).

Phonology

Vowels

Karitiana vowels can be distinguished by the features [high], [back], and [round], and can be short, long, oral or nasal.

Consonants

Karitiana also presents [͡tʃ] and [ʔ], but according to Luciana Storto (1999), the occurrence of the glottal stop is predictable, and [͡tʃ] is extremely rare, though it occurs in Karitiana's personal pronouns. The nasals  are prestopped  if they are preceded by an oral vowel, and poststopped  if they are followed by one. The velar nasal  is denasalized to  before oral vowels in unstressed syllables, poststopped to  before oral vowels in stressed syllables, and prestopped  after oral vowels.

 are nasalized  when surrounded by nasal vowels.

Morphology

In his PhD thesis, Caleb Everett (2006) listed six word classes for Karitiana. In general, Karitiana follows the general trend in Tupi languages of presenting little dependent-marking or nominal morphology, though it has a robust system of agglutinative verbal affixes. Valence-related verbal prefixes occur closer to the verb root than other prefixes, and according to Everett, the most crucial valency distinction in Karitiana is the distinction between semantically monovalent and polyvalent verbs as this plays an important role in verbal inflections and clausal constructions, such as the formation of imperative, interrogative and negative clauses, as well as in the establishment of grammatical relations. Karitiana presents a binary future/non-future tense suffix system and a number of aspect suffixes. It also presents desiderative inflection, an optional evidentiality suffix, a verb-focus system among other constructions. Karitiana presents a nominalizer suffix that is attached to verbs in order to derive nouns. In general, nouns serving as core arguments for a verb are left unmarked for case, but non-core arguments can receive allative and oblique case markers.

Pronouns
Only epicene pronouns exist in Karitiana. This means that no distinction is made between male vs. female (as "he" or "she" in English). There are free pronouns and pronominal prefixes, the latter of which serves to cross-reference the absolutive nominal of a given clause, and also functions as possessors when attached to nouns. It is also worth to mention that the third person pronoun i is the only free pronoun that can be used to express possession.

Examples of free pronouns and pronominal prefixes:

Karitiana has at least six demonstrative pronouns. 'Ka' refers to manner, 'ho' is proximal, 'onɨ̃' is distal, 'ɲã' refers to things that are close and seated, 'hɨp' refers to things that are close and supine, and 'hoːɾi' refers to things that are out of sight.

Causativization
Karitiana expresses causation by the prefix 'm-' or the periphrastic 'tɨpõŋ' (Rocha, 2014), inferring that one participant is causing another to act in a certain manner. The prefix 'm-' is used to add an argument to intransitive verbs, and 'tɨpõŋ' is used to add a third argument to a transitive verb, and the former agent receives the oblique suffix '-tɨ'.

Nominalization
The suffix '-pa' can be attached to non-finite verbs, in general, resulting in a noun that is related to the given verb. The meaning of the resulting noun is quite flexible and it varies according to the context. For example:

In certain contexts 'taɾɨkipa' can be used to refer to canoe, car, airplane, as well as a friend's house that one frequently visits, or make-up and nice clothing, as these are associated, for some Karitiana, to going out in the city.

Verbs associated with '-pa' can also be preceded by a noun in order to reduce the scope of the '-pa' nominal:

In some cases, ’-pa' can also be attached to nouns to derive other nouns. For instance, when attached to nouns representing animals, the result is the animal's habitat or a trail used by it.

Syntax

Case and agreement
Karitiana displays an ergative pattern of agreement, where the subject agrees with the intransitive verb, and the object agrees with the transitive verb, as is shown in examples 1a to 1f. This pattern surfaces in all matrix clauses and is evident from person agreement morphology on verbs, and is true for both declarative and non-declarative sentences. An exception is the object focus construction, where the transitive verb eccentrically agrees with the ergative argument as shown in examples 2a and 2b. This construction does not involve intransitivization, and the eccentric agreement is a product of object focus morphology.

According to Everett (2006), many phenomena in Karitiana follow a nominative pattern generally due to the pragmatic status of arguments. The author argues that the grammatical relations of Karitiana suggest a system where syntactic phenomena often tend to display nominative-accusative patterns, and morphological phenomena tend to display ergative-absolutive patterns.

Semantics

Quantification
Noun phrases (NPs) in Karitiana surface as bare nouns, without any functional operator, such as inflection to mark number or definiteness. Bare nouns can refer to one or more entities, definite or indefinite, and these are determined by the context in which they occur.

Karitiana does not require numeral classifiers, thus numerals receive the oblique suffix -t and are directly linked to common nouns. The numeral system consists of units from 1 to 5, and larger numbers are expressed with a combination of these units.

Karitiana makes a lexical distinction between mass and count nouns. Count nouns can be counted directly, while mass nouns require a system of measurement.

Quantifying expressions can behave like adverbs or nouns. The word si’ĩrimat is used to mean nobody or never, and the word kandat is used to express quantification of nouns and verbs.

Universal quantification is conveyed by the expression (ta)akatyym, where -ta is a third person anaphora, aka is the verb to be, and tyym is the SUBordinate particle. This expression roughly means those who are. Anaphoric ta is used when the quantifying expression is not adjacent to the noun it modifies, and is not necessary when it is adjacent to the noun.

References

Further reading 

“Karitiâna”. Ethnologue, SIL International, www.ethnologue.com/18/language/ktn/.
Kindell, Gloria E. 1981. “Descrição preliminaria da estrutura fonológica da língua Karitiâna”. G.E. Kindell, Guia de análise fonológica, SIL, pp. 196–226
Landin, David J. Dicionário e Léxico Karitiana/Português. Summer Institute of Linguistics, 2005
Muller, Ana. “Distributividade: o caso dos numerais reduplicados em karitiana”. Cadernos de Estudos Linguísticos. UNICAMP, vol. 54, pp. 225–243, 2012.
Muller, Ana; Sanchez-Mendes, L. "O Significado da Pluracionalidade em Karitiana". Cadernos de Estudos Lingüísticos. UNICAMP, vol. 52, pp. 215–231, 2010.
Muller, Ana. “Variação semântica: individuação e número na língua Karitiana”. Estudos Lingüísticos. Universiadade de São Paulo, vol. 38, pp. 295–308, 2009.
Rocha, Ivan. Não-Finitude em Karitiana: subordinação versus nominalização. Ph.D. Thesis. University of São Paulo, 2016
Rocha, Ivan. A estrutura argumental da língua Karitiana. MA Thesis. University of São Paulo, 2011
Storto, L. R. “Subordination in Karitina”. "Amérindia", vol. 35, pp. 219–237, 2012
Storto, L. R. “Paralelos Estruturais entre a Quantificação Universal e as Orações Adverbiais em Karitiana”. Estudos Linguísticos (São Paulo. 1978), vol. 42, pp. 174–181, 2013
Storto, L & I. Rocha (2014). "Estrutura Argumental na Língua Karitiana". Sintaxe e Semântica do Verbo em Línguas Indígenas do Brasil. Campinas: Mercado de Letras. pp. 17–42.
Storto, L. & I. Rocha. (2014). "Strategies of Valence Change in Karitiana". Incremento de Valencia en las Lenguas Amazónicas. Francesc Queixalos, Stella Telles & Ana Carla Bruno (resps.). Universidad Nacional de Colombia & Instituto Caro Y Cuervo. Bogotá. 51-69.
Storto, L. (2014). Reduplication in Karitiana. In Reduplication in the Indigenous languages of South America. Gale Goodwin Gómez & Hein van der Voort (eds.). Brill's Studies in the Indigenous Languages of the Americas. Brill. 401-426.
Storto, L. (2014). "Information Structure and Constituent Order in Karitiana Clauses". Information Structure and Reference Tracking in Complex Sentences. Rik van Gijn, Jeremy Hannond, Dejan Matic, Saskia van Putten & Ana Vilcay Galucio (eds.). Amsterdam/Philadelphia: John Benjamins Publishing Company. 163-191.
Storto, L. R. “Marcação de Concordância Absolutiva em Algumas Construções Sintáticas em Karitiana”. Amérindia, vol. 32, pp. 183–203, 2008
Storto, L. R. “Interactions Between Verb Movement and Agreement in Karitiana (Tupi Stock)”. Revista Letras, vol. 60, pp. 411–433, 2003
Storto, L. R., and Vander Velden, F. F. “Karitiana”. Povos Indígenas no Brasil, Instituto SocioAmbiental, 19 September 2018, https://pib.socioambiental.org/pt/Povo:Karitiana
Vander Velden, F. F. “De volta para o passado: territorialização e ‘contraterritorialização’ na história karitiana”, Sociedade e Cultura, vol. 13, no. 1, 2010, pp. 55-65 
Vander Velden, F. F. Inquietas companhias: sobre os animais de criação entre os Karitiana. São Paulo, Alameda Casa Editorial, 2012. vol. 1

PROX:proximal
SAP:speech act participant voice
NSAP:non-speech act participant voice
OFC:object focus construction

Tupian languages
Mamoré–Guaporé linguistic area